The American Economic Association (AEA) is a learned society in the field of economics. It publishes several peer-reviewed journals acknowledged in business and academia. There are some 23,000 members.

History and Constitution
The AEA was established in 1885 in Saratoga Springs, New York by younger progressive economists trained in the German historical school, including Richard T. Ely, Edwin Robert Anderson Seligman and Katharine Coman, the only woman co-founder; since 1900 it has been under the control of academics.

The purposes of the Association are: 1) The encouragement of economic research, especially the historical and statistical study of the actual conditions of industrial life; 2) The issue of publications on economic subjects; 3) The encouragement of perfect freedom of economic discussion. The Association as such will take no partisan attitude, nor will it commit its members to any position on practical economic questions. The Association publishes one of the most prestigious academic journals in economics: the American Economic Review.

Once composed primarily of college and university teachers of economics, the Association,  headquartered in Nashville, Tennessee, now attracts an increasing number of members from business and professional groups. Today the membership is about 23,000, over half of whom are academics. About 15% are employed in business and industry, and the remainder largely by federal, state, and local government or other not-for-profit organizations.

Activities
AEA, in conjunction with over 50 associations in related disciplines known as the Allied Social Science Associations, holds a three-day annual meeting in January to present papers on general economic subjects. The annual meeting features about 500 scholarly sessions. A placement service to assist employers and job applicants begins a day prior to the meetings. A continuing education program is held immediately after the annual meeting. Topics vary from year to year.

The AEA publishes three economics journals: the American Economic Review, the Journal of Economic Literature, and the Journal of Economic Perspectives. In 2009, it began to publish four new area-specific journals, collectively American Economic Journal (AEJ), reporting on applied economics, economic policy, macroeconomics, and microeconomics. The AEA recognizes annually a Best Paper Award for papers published in each of the four areas.

The AEA also publishes AEA Papers and Proceedings each May, featuring papers presented at the AEA meetings in January. Until 2017, these papers were published in the May issue of the American Economic Review.

The AEA also produces EconLit, the AEA's electronic bibliography. It is a comprehensive index to peer-reviewed journal articles, books, book reviews, collective volume articles, working papers, and dissertations. Compiled and abstracted in a searchable format, EconLit indexes 125 years of economic literature from around the world. It follows the JEL classification codes of the Journal of Economic Literature.

The AEA sponsors RFE: Resources for Economists on the Internet, an online source available to the general public without subscription. It catalogs and annotates 2,000+ internet sites under some 97 sections and subsubsections. RFE is currently updated on a monthly basis.

The AEA resource, Job Openings for Economists (JOE) originated in October 1974, and lists job openings for economists. It is published electronically monthly (except January and July).

Each year, the AEA recognizes the lifetime research contributions of four economists by electing them Distinguished Fellows. The Association also awards annually the John Bates Clark Medal for outstanding research accomplishments in economics to a scholar under the age of 40; it is often referred to as the "Baby Nobel", as many of its recipients go on to become Nobel Laureates.

Association presidents
, the president of the association is Susan Athey, and the president-elect is Janet Currie. As of 2021, 18% of presidents have been alumni and 20% faculty of Harvard University.

Past presidents of the association include:

 1886–92 Francis Amasa Walker
 1893 Charles Franklin Dunbar
 1894—95 John B. Clark
 1896-97 Henry Carter Adams
 1898—99 Arthur Twining Hadley
 1900—01 Richard T. Ely
 1902—03 Edwin Robert Anderson Seligman
 1904—05 Frank W. Taussig
 1906—07 Jeremiah Jenks
 1908 Simon N. Patten
 1909 Davis R. Dewey
 1910 Edmund J. James
 1911 Henry W. Farnam
 1912 Frank A. Fetter
 1913 David Kinley
 1914 John H. Gray
 1915 Walter F. Willcox
 1916 Thomas N. Carver
 1917 John R. Commons
 1918 Irving Fisher
 1919 Henry B. Gardner
 1920 Herbert J. Davenport
 1921 Jacob H. Hollander
 1922 Henry Rogers Seager
 1923 Carl C. Plehn
 1924 Wesley C. Mitchell
 1925 Allyn A. Young
 1926 Edwin W. Kemmerer
 1927 Thomas Sewall Adams
 1928 Fred M. Taylor
 1929 Edwin Francis Gay
 1930 Matthew B. Hammond
 1931 Ernest L. Bogart
 1932 George E. Barnett
 1933 William Z. Ripley
 1934 Harry A. Millis
 1935 John Maurice Clark
 1936 Alvin S. Johnson
 1937 Oliver W. Sprague
 1938 Alvin H. Hansen
 1939 Jacob Viner
 1940 Frederick C. Mills
 1941 Sumner H. Slichter
 1942 Edwin G. Nourse
 1943 Albert B. Wolfe
 1944 Joseph S. Davis
 1945 Isaiah Leo Sharfman
 1946 Emanuel Goldenweiser
 1947 Paul H. Douglas
 1948 Joseph A. Schumpeter
 1949 Howard S. Ellis
 1950 Frank H. Knight
 1951 John H. Williams
 1952 Harold A. Innis
 1953 Calvin B. Hoover
 1954 Simon Kuznets
 1955 John D. Black
 1956 Edwin E. Witte
 1957 Morris A. Copeland
 1958 George W. Stocking
 1959 Arthur F. Burns
 1960 Theodore W. Schultz
 1961 Paul A. Samuelson
 1962 Edward S. Mason
 1963 Gottfried Haberler
 1964 George J. Stigler
 1965 Joseph J. Spengler
 1966 Fritz Machlup
 1967 Milton Friedman
 1968 Kenneth E. Boulding
 1969 William J. Fellner
 1970 Wassily Leontief
 1971 James Tobin
 1972 John Kenneth Galbraith
 1973 Kenneth J. Arrow
 1974 Walter W. Heller
 1975 Robert Aaron Gordon
 1976 Franco Modigliani
 1977 Lawrence R. Klein
 1978 Tjalling C. Koopmans 
Jacob Marschak died before taking office
 1979 Robert M. Solow
 1980 Moses Abramovitz
 1981 William J. Baumol
 1982 H. Gardner Ackley
 1983 W. Arthur Lewis
 1984 Charles L. Schultze
 1985 Charles P. Kindleberger
 1986 Alice M. Rivlin (first female president)
 1987 Gary S. Becker
 1988 Robert Eisner
 1989 Joseph A. Pechman
 1990 Gérard Debreu
 1991 Thomas C. Schelling
 1992 William S. Vickrey
 1993 Zvi Griliches
 1994 Amartya K. Sen
 1995 Victor R. Fuchs
 1996 Anne O. Krueger 
 1997 Arnold C. Harberger
 1998 Robert W. Fogel
 1999 D. Gale Johnson
 2000 Dale W. Jorgenson
 2001 Sherwin Rosen
 2002 Robert E. Lucas, Jr.
 2003 Peter A. Diamond
 2004 Martin S. Feldstein
 2005 Daniel L. McFadden
 2006 George A. Akerlof
 2007 Thomas J. Sargent
 2008 Avinash K. Dixit
 2009 Angus S. Deaton
 2010 Robert E. Hall
 2011 Orley C. Ashenfelter
 2012 Christopher A. Sims
 2013 Claudia Goldin
 2014 William D. Nordhaus
 2015 Richard Thaler
 2016 Robert J. Shiller
 2017 Alvin E. Roth
 2018 Olivier Blanchard
 2019 Ben Bernanke
 2020 Janet Yellen
 2021 David Card
 2022 Christina Romer

Distinguished Fellows
Distinguished Fellow honorees include:

 1965 Edward H. Chamberlin / Harold Hotelling / George J. Stigler
 1966 Abba P. Lerner / Joseph J. Spengler
 1967 Alvin H. Hansen / Fritz Machlup / Jacob Marschak
 1968  Milton Friedman / Lloyd A. Metzler
 1969 Kenneth E. Boulding / Alexander Gerschenkron/ Ludwig E. von Mises
 1970 William J. Fellner /William Arthur Lewis
 1971 Nicholas Georgescu-Roegen / Tjalling C. Koopmans/ Wassily Leontief
 1972 Robert A. Gordon/ Theodore W. Schultz/ Carl S. Shoup/ James Tobin
 1973 John Kenneth Galbraith / Tibor Scitovsky
 1974 Kenneth J. Arrow
 1975 Walter W. Heller
 1976 Oskar Morgenstern / Herbert A. Simon
 1977 Leonid Hurwicz / Harry G. Johnson / Simon Kuznets / Franco Modigliani 
 1978 Lawrence R. Klein / Richard A. Musgrave / William S. Vickrey
 1979 Margaret G. Reid / Ronald H. Coase
 1980 Solomon Fabricant / Charles P. Kindleberger / Robert M. Solow
 1981 Moses Abramovitz / Edward F. Denison / H. Gregg Lewis
 1982 Joe S. Bain / William J. Baumol / Gerard Debreu
 1983 Gardner Ackley / Abram Bergson / James M. Buchanan
 1984 Evsey D. Domar / Albert O. Hirschman
 1985 Joseph Pechman / Paul Rosenstein-Rodan / Charles L. Shultze
 1987 Arthur S. Goldberger / Alice M. Rivlin / Thomas C. Schelling
 1988 Gary S. Becker / Hendrik S. Houthakker / Roy Radner
 1989  Robert Eisner / Jacob Mincer / Guy H. Orcutt
 1990 Victor R. Fuchs / Merton H. Miller
 1991 Irving B. Kravis / Herbert E. Scarf
 1992 Robert Dorfman / Vernon L. Smith
 1993 Lionel W. McKenzie / Anna J. Schwartz
 1994 Zvi Griliches / John C. Harsanyi / Kelvin J. Lancaster
 1995 Geoffrey H. Moore / Walter Oi / Amartya Sen
 1996 Armen A. Alchian / Robert A. Mundell
 1997 Martin Bronfenbrenner / Anne O. Krueger / Gordon Tullock
 1998 Arnold C. Harberger / Alan Heston / Robert Summers
 1999 David Cass / John Chipman / Robert W. Fogel
 2000 Jack Hirshleifer / D. Gale Johnson / Edmund S. Phelps
 2001 Rudiger W. Dornbusch / Dale W. Jorgenson / Allan H. Meltzer
 2002 Clive Granger / Sherwin Rosen / Arnold Zellner
 2003 Irma Adelman / Jagdish Bhagwati / Robert E. Lucas / T.N. Srinivasan
 2004 William A. Brock / Peter A. Diamond / William D. Nordhaus / George P. Shultz
 2005 Stanley L. Engerman / Martin Feldstein / Michael Rothschild / Hugo F. Sonnenschein
 2006 Donald J. Brown / Richard A. Easterlin / Daniel McFadden / Robert B. Wilson
 2007 George A. Akerlof / Orley C. Ashenfelter / Lloyd S. Shapley / Oliver E. Williamson
 2008 Erwin Diewert / Dale Mortensen / Charles Plott / Thomas J. Sargent
 2009 Avinash K. Dixit / Ronald Jones / Douglass North / John Pencavel
 2010 Angus Deaton / Elhanan Helpman / David Kreps / Martin Shubik
 2011 Alan Blinder / William Brainard / Robert E. Hall / Daniel Kahneman / David Wise
 2012 Truman F. Bewley / Marc L. Nerlove / Neil Wallace / Janet L. Yellen
 2013 Harold Demsetz / Stanley Fischer / Jerry Hausman / Paul Joskow / Christopher A. Sims
 2014 Robert J. Barro / Gregory C. Chow / Claudia Goldin / Robert J. Gordon / Richard Zeckhauser
 2015 Theodore Bergstrom / Gary Chamberlain / Thomas Rothenberg / Hal Varian
 2016 Richard Freeman / Glenn Loury / Julio Rotemberg / Isabel Sawhill
 2017 James Heckman / Charles Manski / Robert A. Pollak / Nancy Stokey
 2018 Henry Aaron / Francine Blau / Joel Mokyr / Richard Posner
 2019 Oliver Hart / Edward Lazear / Ariel Pakes / Margaret Slade
 2020 Katharine Abraham / Shelly Lundberg / Paul Milgrom / Whitney Newey
 2021 Alan Auerbach / Rebecca Blank / Anne Case / Robert Townsend
 2022 Sadie T.M. Alexander / David Card / Barry Eichengreen / James Poterba / Carmen Reinhart

See also
 European Economic Association
 International Economic Association
 Political Economy Club

References

External links
 

 
1885 establishments in New York (state)
1885 in economics
Business and finance professional associations
Economics societies
Learned societies of the United States
Organizations based in Nashville, Tennessee
Organizations established in 1885
Professional associations based in the United States